Medanitos may refer to:

Medanitos (Santa María), a village in Catamarca Province, Argentina
Medanitos (Tinogasta), a village in Catamarca Province, Argentina